Elections in Pennsylvania elect the five state-level offices, the Pennsylvania General Assembly, including the senate and house of representatives, as well as the state's congressional delegation for the United States Senate and the United States House of Representatives. Presidential elections are held every four years in Pennsylvania. The state is one of the most competitive nationally, with narrow victories that alternate between the parties across all major offices. On the presidential level, the state has been considered a swing state throughout its entire history as it only voted for the nationwide loser on only 10 occasions (1824, 1884, 1892, 1912, 1916, 1932, 1948, 1968, 2000, and 2004). Meaning it has voted for the national winner 83% of the time, as of 2020. 

In a 2020 study, Pennsylvania was ranked by the Election Law Journal as the 19th hardest state for citizens to vote in.

House of Representatives

Pennsylvania's congressional delegation is composed of nine Democrats and eight Republicans, since the 2022 elections. 

The five most recent House elections:
2022 United States House of Representatives elections in Pennsylvania
2020 United States House of Representatives elections in Pennsylvania
2018 United States House of Representatives elections in Pennsylvania
2016 United States House of Representatives elections in Pennsylvania
2014 United States House of Representatives elections in Pennsylvania

Presidential elections

Below is a table of the last eleven presidential elections in Pennsylvania, as well as national electoral college results. On the presidential level, the state has been considered a swing state throughout its entire history as it only voted for the nationwide loser on only 10 occasions (1824, 1884, 1892, 1912, 1916, 1932, 1948, 1968, 2000, and 2004). Meaning it has voted for the national winner 83% of the time, as of 2020. However, since the 1992 election, the state has leaned Democratic, voting that way in seven of the eight elections since then, although mostly by margins under 10 points.

United States Senate elections

Class I Senate elections 
The five most recent elections:
2018 United States Senate election in Pennsylvania
2012 United States Senate election in Pennsylvania
2006 United States Senate election in Pennsylvania
2000 United States Senate election in Pennsylvania
1994 United States Senate election in Pennsylvania

Class III Senate elections 
The five most recent elections:
2022 United States Senate election in Pennsylvania
2016 United States Senate election in Pennsylvania
2010 United States Senate election in Pennsylvania
2004 United States Senate election in Pennsylvania
1998 United States Senate election in Pennsylvania

Senator Bob Casey Jr. (serving since 2007) is the first Democrat to be popularly elected as a senator by Pennsylvania voters to more than two terms. Democratic senator John Fetterman entered office in January 2023, succeeding Republican Pat Toomey who retired after two terms.

Gubernatorial elections

The ten most recent elections:
2022 Pennsylvania gubernatorial election
2018 Pennsylvania gubernatorial election
2014 Pennsylvania gubernatorial election
2010 Pennsylvania gubernatorial election
2006 Pennsylvania gubernatorial election
2002 Pennsylvania gubernatorial election
1998 Pennsylvania gubernatorial election
1994 Pennsylvania gubernatorial election
1990 Pennsylvania gubernatorial election
1986 Pennsylvania gubernatorial election

Democrats and Republicans have alternated in the governorship of Pennsylvania every eight years from 1950 to 2010. This has been referred to as "the cycle", but it was broken with a Democratic Party win in 2014. Pennsylvania has also voted against the party of the sitting president in 19 of the last 21 gubernatorial contests dating back to 1938; Democrats lost 16 of the previous 18 Pennsylvania gubernatorial races with a Democratic president in the White House, a pattern begun in 1860.

Pennsylvania General Assembly elections
The Pennsylvania General Assembly is a bicameral legislature, consisting of the Pennsylvania State Senate (the upper house) and the Pennsylvania House of Representatives (lower house). Republicans have controlled the state House for all but four years since 1995, and they have controlled the state Senate uninterrupted since 1993.

Senate
The five most recent elections:
2022 Pennsylvania Senate election
2020 Pennsylvania Senate election
2018 Pennsylvania Senate election
2016 Pennsylvania Senate election
2014 Pennsylvania Senate election

House of Representatives
The five most recent elections:
2022 Pennsylvania House of Representatives election
2020 Pennsylvania House of Representatives election
2018 Pennsylvania House of Representatives election
2016 Pennsylvania House of Representatives election
2014 Pennsylvania House of Representatives election

See also
Electoral reform in Pennsylvania
Political party strength in Pennsylvania
Politics of Pennsylvania
 2020 Pennsylvania elections
Women's suffrage in Pennsylvania

References

External links
Voting and Elections at the Pennsylvania Department of State official website

 
 
  (State affiliate of the U.S. League of Women Voters)
 . (Also: 1995 & 1996, 1997 & 1998, 1999 & 2000, 2001 & 2002, 2003 & 2004,  2005 & 2006, 2007 & 2008, 2009 & 2010, 2011 & 2012, 2013 & 2014, 2015 & 2016, 2017 & 2018).
 Digital Public Library of America. Assorted materials related to Pennsylvania elections
 

 
Government of Pennsylvania
Political events in Pennsylvania